is a Japanese voice actor affiliated with VIMS. After realizing the potential of voice acting by listening to radio shows, Ichikawa was inspired to enter vocational school and become a voice actor. Some of his noteworthy roles include Kurogo Kurusu in Kabukibu!, Twenty-Fifth Bam in Tower of God, and Reito Mizuhara in World's End Harem.

Biography
Taichi Ichikawa was born in Tokyo on February 4. In high school, Ichikawa was a fan of a radio show by Showtaro Morikubo, where Ichikawa became impressed with the possibilities of voice acting. While in university, he managed to save up enough money to attend vocational school afterwards. There, voice actor Jun Fukushima taught him how to properly voice act in series. He later began voice acting professionally in 2015 with additional voices in Aoharu × Machinegun.

Filmography

Anime
2017
 Kabukibu! as Kurogo Kurusu

2018
 Major 2nd as Hayato Urabe
 Bloom Into You as Seiji Maki

2019
 Vinland Saga as Anne's Siblings

2020
 From Argonavis as Kanata Nijō
 Tower of God as Twenty-Fifth Bam

2021
 Horimiya as High School Boys
 World's End Harem as Reito Mizuhara

Video games
2022
 Trinity Trigger as Cyan
 Dream Meister and the Recollected Black Fairy as Searle

References

External links
 Official agency profile 
 

Living people
Japanese male video game actors
Japanese male voice actors
Male voice actors from Tokyo
Year of birth missing (living people)